Linda L. Ujifusa is an American attorney and politician serving as a member of the Rhode Island Senate for the 11th district. Elected in November 2022, she assumed office on January 3, 2023.

Early life and education 
A third-generation Japanese-American, Ujifusa was born and raised in San Jose, California. She earned a Bachelor of Arts degree from Harvard University and a Juris Doctor from the New York University School of Law.

Career 
Prior to entering politics, Ujifusa worked as an attorney at Mintz Levin and the United States Environmental Protection Agency. She also taught legal writing courses at the University of California, Hastings College of the Law. Ujifusa became involved in politics during the Bernie Sanders 2016 presidential campaign and later served as a member of the Portsmouth Town Council from 2018 to 2022. She was elected to the Rhode Island Senate in November 2022.

References 

Living people
American politicians of Japanese descent
American women of Japanese descent in politics
People from San Jose, California
Politicians from San Jose, California
Harvard University alumni
New York University School of Law alumni
Rhode Island lawyers
Democratic Party Rhode Island state senators
Women state legislators in Rhode Island
Mintz Levin people
People from Portsmouth, Rhode Island
Year of birth missing (living people)